Keith Paskett is a former wide receiver in the National Football League.

Biography
Paskett was born Keith Paxton Paskett on December 7, 1964 in Nashville, Tennessee.
1982 Graduate of Glencliff Comprehensive High School in Nashville, Tn
ran track and played football

Career
Paskett played with the Green Bay Packers during the 1987 NFL season. He played at the collegiate level at Western Kentucky University.

See also
List of Green Bay Packers players

References

People from Nashville, Tennessee
Green Bay Packers players
American football wide receivers
Western Kentucky University alumni
Western Kentucky Hilltoppers football players
Living people
1964 births